RonNell Andersen Jones is the Lee E. Teitelbaum endowed professor of law and Associate Dean of Faculty and Research at the S.J. Quinney College of Law at the University of Utah. She is also an Affiliated Fellow at Yale Law School's Information Society Project. Previously, Jones was a law professor and Associate Dean of Academic Affairs and Research at the J. Reuben Clark Law School at Brigham Young University, where she was twice named Professor of the Year. Jones has previously been a reporter employed by the Deseret News and she specializes in the study of the integration of the press, the law, and the courts.

Jones was born in Tremonton, Utah.  Jones has a bachelor's degree from Utah State University and earned her J.D. at the Ohio State University where she graduated first in her class, summa cum laude.  She has been a lecturer on media law at Ohio Wesleyan University and was a distinguished faculty fellow at the University of Arizona before joining the faculty of BYU.

Jones was a law clerk for Sandra Day O'Connor as well as for William A. Fletcher of the 9th Circuit Court of Appeals.

See also 
 List of law clerks of the Supreme Court of the United States (Seat 8)

References

Sources
 Deseret News, Feb. 24, 2009
 BYU Law School bio
 University of Arizona listing

People from Ogden, Utah
American lawyers
American women journalists
Law clerks of the Supreme Court of the United States
Brigham Young University faculty
Living people
Ohio Wesleyan University faculty
University of Arizona faculty
Utah State University alumni
American women lawyers
Ohio State University Moritz College of Law alumni
People from Tremonton, Utah
Year of birth missing (living people)